Kanada may refer to:

Kanada (philosopher), the Hindu sage who founded the philosophy of Vaisheshika
Kanada (family of ragas), a group of ragas in Hindustani music
Kanada (surname)
Kanada Station, train station in Fukuoka, Japan
Kannada, one of the major Dravidian languages of India
Kannada people
Canada, a country in North America (as it is spelled in many languages)
Kanada warehouses, Auschwitz, storage facilities in Auschwitz for looted property

See also
Canada (disambiguation)
Kannada (disambiguation)
Kaneda, a Japanese surname
Kanata (disambiguation)